Milton Mills may refer to the following places in the United States:

Milton Mills, New Hampshire, census-designated place
Milton Mills (Orangeburg, Kentucky), listed on the National Register of Historic Places